Posti is a Poland-based tea company founded in 1953. It is the oldest tea company in Poland.

History 
Posti was founded in 1953. According to a ranking of Polish tea brands by the newspaper Rzeczpospolita, Posti is the third most valuable Polish tea brand.

Posti brand introduced quality teas, including Yunnan and Indian Madras, to Poland in the 1950s. In 1968, Posti introduced express tea to Poland. In the 1980s, Posti introduced fruit teas, and in 1997 aromatic herbal teas.

Awards 
Posti has been granted the following awards:

 Golden receipt 2011
 FMCG Hit 2010
 Market Leader 2011
 Leader of Sales 2011
 Distinction Złoty Paragon 2015

Products 
Product portfolio is divided into four main categories: Black, Green, Herbal and Fruit teas. The brand offers more than thirty products.

References 

Tea companies
Drink companies of Poland
Food and drink companies established in 1953
1953 establishments in Poland
Polish brands